Foot fault, foot-fault or footfault may refer to;

Sports
 Foot fault, when a competitor's foot placement does not comply with the official rules in sports such as:
 Bowls
 Pickleball
 Tennis
 Volleyball

Television
 Foot Fault, a Season 4 episode of The Secret World of Alex Mack
 Foot Fault, an episode of The House
 Chapter 5: Foot Fault, a Season 1 episode of Gēmusetto